The Thomas and Mary Webb House, is a historic residence in Lehi, Utah, United States, that is listed on the National Register of Historic Places (NRHP).

Description
The house is located at 388 North 200 East and was built in 1903.   It was built in 1903: its walls were constructed out of fired brick.

The Webbs were a successful local family. Thomas was Mayor of Lehi from 1905 to 1909. His father George, who bought the house plot in 1894, was the owner and editor of the Lehi Banner, the local newspaper. Thomas and Mary married in Salt Lake City in 1882 and raised three children in the Lehi house, which remained their family home throughout their lives.

It was listed on the NRHP December 4, 1998.

See also

 National Register of Historic Places listings in Utah County, Utah

References

External links

Houses on the National Register of Historic Places in Utah
Victorian architecture in Utah
Neoclassical architecture in Utah
Houses completed in 1903
Houses in Utah County, Utah
Buildings and structures in Lehi, Utah
National Register of Historic Places in Utah County, Utah